Walton Hills is a village in Cuyahoga County, Ohio, United States. The population was 2,281 at the 2010 census.

Geography
Walton Hills is located at  (41.364304, -81.554377).

Demographics

2010 census
As of the census of 2010, there were 2,281 people, 937 households, and 681 families living in the village. The racial makeup of the village was 90.7% White, 8.1% African American, 0.2% Native American, 0.3% Asian, and 0.7% from two or more races. Hispanic or Latino of any race were 0.7% of the population.

There were 937 households, of which 16.3% had children under the age of 18 living with them, 63.1% were married couples living together, 6.6% had a female householder with no husband present, 3.0% had a male householder with no wife present, and 27.3% were non-families. 23.5% of all households were made up of individuals, and 13.6% had someone living alone who was 65 years of age or older. The average household size was 2.27 and the average family size was 2.65.

The median age in the village was 55.4 years. 11.2% of residents were under the age of 18; 4.8% were between the ages of 18 and 24; 13.2% were from 25 to 44; 40.1% were from 45 to 64; and 30.8% were 65 years of age or older. The gender makeup of the village was 47.8% male and 52.2% female.

2000 census
As of the census of 2000, there were 2,400 people, 903 households, and 720 families living in the village. The population density was 349.0 people per square mile (134.7/km). There were 919 housing units at an average density of 133.6 per square mile (51.6/km). The racial makeup of the village was 96.46% White, 2.08% African American, 0.50% Asian, 0.08% from other races, and 0.88% from two or more races. Hispanic or Latino of any race were 0.92% of the population.

There were 903 households, out of which 21.5% had children under the age of 18 living with them, 69.9% were married couples living together, 7.0% had a female householder with no husband present, and 20.2% were non-families. 16.8% of all households were made up of individuals, and 10.0% had someone living alone who was 65 years of age or older. The average household size was 2.53 and the average family size was 2.85.

In the village, the population was spread out, with 17.0% under the age of 18, 5.8% from 18 to 24, 21.7% from 25 to 44, 29.0% from 45 to 64, and 26.5% who were 65 years of age or older. The median age was 48 years. For every 100 females there were 91.5 males. For every 100 females age 18 and over, there were 88.3 males.

The median income for a household in the village was $62,321, and the median income for a family was $67,537. Males had a median income of $41,900 versus $27,841 for females. The per capita income for the village was $26,405. About 1.1% of families and 2.1% of the population were below the poverty line, including 2.6% of those under age 18 and 3.4% of those age 65 or over.

References

External links
 Village website

Villages in Cuyahoga County, Ohio
Villages in Ohio